Airija is a folk-rock band formed in Alytus, Lithuania in September 1992. Irish art and culture have had a great influence on the creation of this group. Name of the group Airija means Ireland in the Lithuanian language.

Biography 
In 1994 Airija released first album "Yra" (There is), that reached the top 10 of Lithuanian rock. 1995-1996 Airija recorded three more albums: "Čia" (Here), "Yra čia" a live unplugged recording, and "Pasaka" which has kept the band on the top for the five years.

In 1996 the group participated  in a joint project with Kaunas Little Theater, called "Photos from the Old Album". The project created a unique mix of acoustic music and theatrical pantomime, which was recognized as the best musical project of the year in Lithuania.

In year 2000 the band suspended activity and members pursued other musical projects. Group was briefly revived in 2002 to celebrate 10th anniversary of the band.

Members 
 Darius Mileris Nojus - vocals, guitars, music, lyrics;
 Koka - bass guitar;
 Eima - violin, reed-pipe, clarinet, backing vocals, music;
 Asta Milerienė - drums, tambourine.

Discography 
 Yra (Is) (1994)
 Čia (Here) (1995)
 Yra čia (Is here) (1996)
 Pasaka (Fairytale) (1996)
 Naujas (New) (1998)

Awards 
 Bravo music awards  Discovery of the Year winner, 1993.
 The Rock Group of the Year in Lithuania, 1995
 Third place in France  MCM for the Best Small Budget Music Video ( song Į save per save).
 Alytus City Cultural Award, 1997

References

External links 
 

Musical groups established in 1992
Lithuanian rock music groups
1992 establishments in Lithuania